Lucien Bochard (10 August 1925 – 2 May 2002) was a French footballer.  He competed in the men's tournament at the 1952 Summer Olympics.

References

External links
 
 

1925 births
2002 deaths
French footballers
Olympic footballers of France
Footballers at the 1952 Summer Olympics
Place of birth missing
Association football defenders
CS Sedan Ardennes players